Hexapus is a genus of crabs in the family Hexapodidae. It contains only three extant species found in the Indo-West Pacific. They inhabit the intertidal and subtidal areas of shorelines.

Description

Like other members of the family, these crabs are easily recognizable due to the complete absence of the last pair of walking legs (pereiopods). They thus only have six walking legs (excluding the claws), unlike the usual eight. Their carapace is subquadrate, wider than it is long, with a rounded anterior.

Species
The following are the species classified under Hexapus. 

Extant species
Hexapus bidentatus Velip & Rivonker, 2014
Found in Goa, India
Hexapus sexpes (Fabricius, 1798) 
Found from Cochin, southwest India to Phuket, Thailand and the Penang Strait of Malaysia
Hexapus timika Rahayu & Ng, 2014 
Found in Timika, Papua, Indonesia

Fossil species
Hexapus decapoda (Morris & Collins, 1991) 
Originally described as Prepaeduma decapoda. From Sarawak, Borneo, Malaysia (Miri Formation, Pliocene)
Hexapus granuliformis Karasawa & Kato, 2008 
From Bolbe, Davao City, Philippines (Mandug Formation, early Pleistocene)
Hexapus nakajimai Imaizumi, 1959
From the Jōban Coal Field of Iwaki, Fukushima, Japan (Nakayama Formation, Miocene)
Hexapus pinfoldi Collins & Morris, 1978 
From the Khyber Pakhtunkhwa of Pakistan (Kirthar Formation, Lutetian)

Excluded species
Hexapus estuarinus is now regarded as a junior synonym of Hexapus sexpes. In addition, the following the species has been transferred to other genera:
Hexapus anfractus (Rathbun, 1909)  - Originally described as Lambdophallus anfractus, now accepted as Mariaplax anfracta
Hexapus buchanani Monod, 1956 - Now accepted as Theoxapus buchanani
Hexapus edwardsii Serène & Soh, 1976 - Now accepted as Hexapinus edwardsii
Hexapus granuliferus Campbell & Stephenson, 1970 - Now accepted as Mariaplax granuliferus
Hexapus latipes De Haan, 1835 - Now accepted as Hexapinus latipes
Hexapus stebbingi Barnard, 1947 - Now accepted as Tritoplax stebbingi
Hexapus stephenseni Serène & Soh, 1976 - Now accepted as Mariaplax stephenseni
Hexapus williamsi Glassell, 1938 - Now accepted as Stevea williamsi

References

Crabs
Extant Lutetian first appearances
Lutetian genus first appearances
Taxa named by Wilhem de Haan